Faisal Hayat Sherani is a Pakistani politician who was a member of the Provincial Assembly of the Punjab from August 2018 to May 2022.

Political Career Of Faisal Hayat Sherani

He was elected to the Provincial Assembly of the Punjab as an independent candidate from Constituency PP-125 (Jhang-II) in 2018 Pakistani general election.

He joined Pakistan Tehreek-e-Insaf (PTI) following his election.

On 11 September 2018, he was inducted into the provincial Punjab cabinet of Chief Minister Usman Buzdar and was appointed as advisor to the Chief Minister on Livestock and Dairy Development.

Mr Faisal Hayat Sherani, son of Mr Ghazanfar Ali Khan, Jabboana graduated in 1999 from F.C.College, Lahore and obtained post-graduate diploma from National University of Modern Language, Islamabd in 2000. He has been elected as Member Provincial Assembly of the Punjab in General Elections 2002, and was Chairman, Standing Committee on Culture and Youth Affairs. His father was Member Punjab Assembly during 1990-93 and 1997-99 and also served as Parliamentary Secretary during 1997-99. He de-seated due to vote against party policy for Chief Minister of Punjab election  on 16 April 2022.

References

Living people
Pakistan Tehreek-e-Insaf MPAs (Punjab)
Year of birth missing (living people)